Nuk Ju (also Romanized as Nūk Jū and Nowkajoo; also known as Nokjū and Nūkdū) is a village in Zaboli Rural District, in the Central District of Mehrestan County, Sistan and Baluchestan Province, Iran. At the 2006 census, its population was 239, in 46 families.

References 

Populated places in Mehrestan County